Saul John Launer (November 5, 1919 – November 8, 2006), was an American television and film actor. Launer was born in Cleveland, Ohio, United States.

Career
Launer appeared in 89 films and television programs between 1943 and 1977.  In most of his films, he is uncredited. His first acting role was in the television series Meet Corliss Archer (1954) and his career ended with the film Billionaire Boys Club (1987).

In 1956, he performed in Calder Willingham's play End as a Man at the Players Ring Gallery in West Hollywood. A review by Jerry Pam in the Valley Times said Launer's performance was "at times, too philosophical" but that he seemed at home with children and that his end speech was "exciting".

Launer's film credits include The Werewolf (1956), I Was a Teenage Werewolf (1957), Jailhouse Rock (1957), The Crowded Sky (1960), Marnie (1964), and Pendulum (1969).

His television credits include Father Knows Best (1956), The Ford Television Theatre (1956–57), The George Sanders Mystery Theater (1957), State Trooper (1958), Dr. Kildare (1963), The Twilight Zone (1959–63), Dragnet (1969–70), Harry O (1973–74). He also acted in the Gunsmoke episode "Robin Hood."

Launer was injured in a stagecoach accident on the set of Laramie in 1960. Launer, who had been riding inside the stagecoach, received lacerations, while another actor, Bert Spencer, was harmed to the point that one of his legs required amputation.

His most famous role was his nine years as a criminal court judge on Perry Mason.

Filmography

References

External links
 

Male actors from Cleveland
American male film actors
American male television actors
20th-century American male actors
1919 births
2006 deaths
Death in California